Thomas or Tom Bolton may refer to:

Thomas Nelson, 2nd Earl Nelson (1786–1835), born Thomas Bolton
Thomas Bolton (politician) (1841–1906), British politician
Thomas Henry Bolton (1841–1916), British solicitor and politician
Thomas Bolton (mayor) (died 1862), mayor of the Borough of Liverpool, England
Tom Bolton (astronomer) (1943–2021), American-Canadian astronomer
Tom Bolton (baseball) (born 1962), American professional baseball pitcher
Tom Bolton, winner of the Distinguished Canadian Retail of the Year Award, 1983